Verónica Cuadrado Dehesa (born 8 March 1979 in Santander, Cantabria) is a former Spanish handball player who was member of the Spanish women's national team.

She was part of the Spanish team at the 2008 European Women's Handball Championship, where the Spanish team reached the final, after defeating Germany in the semifinal.

Cuadrado was a member of the Spanish team that won the bronze medal at the 2011 World Handball Championships. She was also part of the Spanish team that won bronze at the 2012 Summer Olympics.

References

External links
 Profile on Randers HK official website

Spanish female handball players
1979 births
Sportspeople from Santander, Spain
Handball players from Cantabria
Living people
Expatriate handball players
Spanish expatriate sportspeople in Denmark
Olympic medalists in handball
Olympic handball players of Spain
Handball players at the 2012 Summer Olympics
Olympic bronze medalists for Spain
Medalists at the 2012 Summer Olympics
Mediterranean Games medalists in handball
Mediterranean Games gold medalists for Spain
Competitors at the 2005 Mediterranean Games
Competitors at the 2009 Mediterranean Games